Gustavo Ariel Bermúdez Ricciardi (born July 21, 1964 in Rosario, Argentina) is an Argentine actor.

Biography 
Gustavo Bermúdez is the son of Manuel Bermúdez and Isabel Ricciardi. He has a brother who is three years older than him called, Gabriel. Gustavo studied at the Colegio La Salle.

Personal life 
Gustavo Bermúdez and Andrea González met in 1983 when he was 19 years old and she 18 years old. In the year 1989, Gustavo Bermúdez married Andrea González, a teacher. The couple divorced in the year 2011. On September 25, 1991, the couple's first child, a girl, was born whom, they called Camila Bermúdez González. On October 21, 2000, the couple's second child, a girl, was born whom, they called Manuela Bermúdez González.

Since 2020, Gustavo Bermúdez is in a relationship with the actress and television presenter, Verónica Varano.

Career 
Gustavo Ariel Bermúdez began his career in television in 1982. In 1982, he was part of the play El país de mi infancia. Between 1982 and 1983, he made the theatrical seasons of Monserrat. From 1983 to 1986, he was part of the cast of the youth television series Pelito. In 1985, he was the protagonist of the television series Rossé. In 1986, he was the protagonist of the television series El hombre que amo. In 1987, he was the protagonist of the television series Grecia with Grecia Colmenares. In 1988, he was part of the cast of the television series No va más (la vida nos separa). In 1990, he was the protagonist of the television series Quiero gritar que te amo with Andrea del Boca. In 1990, he was part of the cast of the television series Amándote II. In 1991, he was part of the cast of the television series El árbol azul. In 1991, he was the protagonist of the television series Celeste with Andrea del Boca. In 1991, he was the protagonist of the television series Antonella with Andrea del Boca. In 1993, he was the protagonist of the television series Celeste siempre Celeste with Andrea del Boca. In 1994, he was the protagonist of the television series Nano with Araceli González. From 1994 to 1995, he was part of the cast of the mexican television series Volver a Empezar. In 1995, he was the protagonist of the television series Sheik with Araceli González. In 1995, he was part of the play Romeo y Julieta. In 1996, he was he was part of the cast of the television series Alén, luz de luna. In 1997, he was he was part of the cast of the television series Laberinto sin ley. In 1998, he was the protagonist of the television series Alas, poder y pasión with Paola Krum. In 2002, he was the protagonist of the television series 1000 millones with Araceli González. In 2004, he was part of the cast of the television series Viva el español. In 2005, he was the protagonist of the television series El Patrón de la Vereda with Camila Bordonaba. From 2006 to 2007, he was part of the cast of the television series Sos mi vida. In 2014, he was the protagonist of the television series Somos familia with Ana María Orozco. Between 2015 and 2016, he made the theatrical seasons of Extraña pareja. In 2018, he makes a small participation in the television series El host. In 2021, he returns to television starring in the series Los protectores with Adrián Suar, Andrés Parra and Laura Fernández.

Filmography

Theater

Television

References

Argentine male actors
People from Rosario, Santa Fe
1964 births
Living people